Taikanite is a silicate mineral. It was named after the Taikan Range, Russia, its type locality.

Properties
Taikanite is a mineral with a color that ranges from emerald green to blackish-green. It  crystallizes in the monoclinic system. It has a high relative density of 4.72. The mineral has a hardness of 6 to 7.

Occurrence
The type locality is the Taikan Range, in the Khabarovsk Krai, Russian Far East, where the mineral was discovered in a manganese deposit. It has also been found in Hotazel, Northern Cape province, South Africa.

See also
List of minerals recognized by the International Mineralogical Association (T)

References

Silicate minerals
Strontium minerals
Barium minerals
Manganese minerals